Glen Keane (born April 13, 1954) is an American animator, author and illustrator. He was a character animator at Walt Disney Animation Studios for feature films including The Little Mermaid, Beauty and the Beast, Aladdin, Pocahontas, Tarzan and Tangled. He received the 1992 Annie Award for character animation and the 2007 Winsor McCay Award for lifetime contribution to the field of animation. He was named a Disney Legend in 2013.

In 2017, Keane directed Dear Basketball, an animated short film based on Kobe Bryant's retirement poem in The Players' Tribune, for which Keane and Bryant received the Academy Award for Best Animated Short Film at the 90th Academy Awards.

Early life
Keane was born in Philadelphia, Pennsylvania, the son of cartoonist Bil Keane, creator of The Family Circus, and Australian-born Thelma Keane (née Carne). He was raised in Paradise Valley, Arizona as a Roman Catholic.

Keane's interest in art developed from observing his father's work as a cartoonist. (Keane's father based his Family Circus character of Billy on Glen's younger self.) To encourage Glen to draw, his father gave him a copy of Burne Hogarth's Dynamic Anatomy, and recommended he observe body forms and practice creative approaches to life drawing. 

After graduating from high school at Brophy College Preparatory in 1972, Keane applied to the California Institute of the Arts School of Art, rather than accepting a football scholarship to another college. His application was accidentally sent to the Program in Experimental Animation (then called Film Graphics), where he was mentored by Jules Engel.

Career

Keane left CalArts in 1974 and joined Disney the same year, where he spent three years working with veteran animator Ollie Johnston on the characters Bernard and Penny in The Rescuers. He subsequently animated Elliott the Dragon in Pete's Dragon, and the climactic bear showdown in The Fox and the Hound. 

In 1982, inspired by the groundbreaking film Tron, Keane collaborated with animator John Lasseter (Toy Story, Toy Story 2) on a 30-second test scene of Maurice Sendak's Where the Wild Things Are, which was optioned for them by Disney executive Tom Wilhite. The test integrated traditional character animation and computer-generated backgrounds, and, like Tron, was a cooperation with MAGI. It was Disney's first experiment with digitally-drawn characters. Although the project was revolutionary (and became a predecessor to the famous ballroom scene in Beauty and the Beast), Disney declined to invest further in the featurette due to its cost.

In 1983, Keane left contract employment with Disney and worked as a freelance artist. He animated the character Professor Ratigan in Disney's The Great Mouse Detective; the "Boys and Girls of Rock n' Roll" and "Getting Lucky" in The Chipmunk Adventure; and the characters Fagin, Sykes, Jenny Foxworth and Georgette in Oliver & Company. 

He became a lead character animator, one of the group of young animators mentored by "Disney's Nine Old Men". Keane animated some of Disney's most memorable characters in what has been called the "New "Golden Age" of Disney Animation. He designed and animated the character of Ariel in the film The Little Mermaid (1989), and the eagle Marahute in The Rescuers Down Under. He was supervising animator for the title characters of the three Disney hit features Beauty and the Beast, Aladdin and Pocahontas.

While living with his family in Paris, France for three years, Keane completed work on Disney's 1999 Tarzan, for which he drew the eponymous character. He then returned to Disney's Burbank studio as the lead animator for John Silver in Treasure Planet. 

In 2003, he began work as the director of Disney's CGI animated film Tangled (based on the Brothers Grimm story Rapunzel), released in November 2010, where Keane and his team strove to bring the style and warmth of traditional animation to computer animation. In October 2008, due to "non-life threatening health issues", Keane stepped back as director of Tangled, but remained the film's executive producer and an animating director.

On March 23, 2012, Keane left Walt Disney Animation Studios after 37 years there. In a letter to his coworkers, he said, “I owe so much to those great animators who mentored me – Eric Larson, Frank Thomas and Ollie Johnston – as well as to the many other wonderful people at Disney whom I have been fortunate to work with in the past nearly 38 years. I am convinced that animation really is the ultimate form of our time with endless new territories to explore. I can’t resist its siren call to step out and discover them.”

He later said that one of the reasons he left Disney was his experience during the production of Tangled, which underwent several storyline and title changes. He felt that in a big studio like Disney, there were too many conflicting interests, with management pulling people "in too many different directions". 

In December 2013, it was announced that Keane joined Motorola's Advanced Technology and Projects Group to help its engineers create interactive hand-drawn animation. He released his first animated short, Duet, at the Google I/O Conference in San Francisco on June 25, 2014. It is the first hand-drawn cartoon made at 60 frames per second, and the third in a series of shorts, called the Spotlight Stories, designed to explore spatial awareness and the sensory inputs of a mobile device to create distinctive storytelling experiences. When Google sold its Motorola subsidiary in early 2014, Keane and  his group remained there. 

In 2015, it was revealed that Keane and 16 other prominent artists and filmmakers had been hired by the Paris Opera to work on their 3rd Stage project. 

Keane is the creator of the animated short Nephtali (a reference to Jacob's blessings and Psalm 42), on which he collaborated with choreographer and ballet dancer Marion Barbeau.

In addition to his work as an animator, Keane has written and illustrated a series of children's books based on Bible parables, featuring the characters Adam Raccoon and King Aren the Lion.

Keane directed the Chinese animated film Over the Moon, about a girl who builds a rocket and flies to the moon to meet a legendary moon goddess. Written by Audrey Wells, produced by Pearl Studio, and animated by Sony Pictures Imageworks, it was released on Netflix on October 23, 2020.

At the 2018 Oscars, Keane shared the Academy Award for Best Animated Short Film with Kobe Bryant for Dear Basketball, which was based on a poem Bryant wrote on his retirement.  On May 26, 2018 Keane received the 2017 Reuben Award for the Cartoonist of the Year  in his hometown of Philadelphia, PA.

Personal life
In 1975, during the production of his debut film, Keane married Linda Hesselroth. They are the parents of design artist Claire Keane and computer graphics artist Max Keane.

Keane has been cited among artists with aphantasia, a condition characterized by an inability to form mental images. He is a Christian.

Filmography

Publications

References

External links

 "Glen Keane Productions" Official Website
 
 
 "The Art of Glen Keane" Blog
 Glen Keane interview for the Animation Podcast
 Interview with Glen Keane about 'Tangled', April 18, 2011
 
• Original illustrations from his children's books at AdamRaccoon.com

1954 births
American children's writers
American storyboard artists
American animated film directors
American Roman Catholics
Annie Award winners
Animators from Arizona
Animators from Pennsylvania
California Institute of the Arts alumni
Living people
American people of Australian descent
Directors of Best Animated Short Academy Award winners
Film directors from Arizona
Film directors from Pennsylvania
People from Paradise Valley, Arizona
Artists from Arizona
Artists from Philadelphia
Filmation people
Walt Disney Animation Studios people
Netflix people